671 Carnegia is a minor planet orbiting the Sun.

References

External links
 
 

Background asteroids
Carnegia
Carnegia
Xk-type asteroids (SMASS)
19080921